The Norway women's national volleyball team represents Norway in international women's volleyball competitions and friendly matches and it is ruled and managed by the Norwegian Volleyball Federation That is an affiliate of Federation of International Volleyball FIVB and also a part of European Volleyball Confederation CEV.
However Norway Does not made any international appearances until nowadays. 
They often participate in European Qualifications Tournament, also since Norway follow the NEVZA volleyball body for northern European countries, they play often exhibition matches against these body members teams.

Results

Summer Olympics
 Champions   Runners up   Third place   Fourth place

World Championship
 Champions   Runners up   Third place   Fourth place

European Championship
 Champions   Runners-up   Third place   4th place

Team

Previous squad

References

External links
Norwegian Volleyball Federation

Volleyball
National women's volleyball teams
Volleyball in Norway